Lam Wa is a watercourse of the Thai highlands in Thailand, a tributary of the Nan River, part of the Chao Phraya River basin.

Lam Wa is a popular watercourse for white water rafting.

See also
List of whitewater rivers

References

External links
Nan Province & Nam Wa River - Sop Mang Village to Mae Charim National Park

Wa
Nan River
Geography of Nan province